Jeon Jun-Hyung (born 28 August 1986) is a South Korean footballer who currently plays for Incheon United in the K League Challenge.

External links
 

1986 births
Living people
Association football defenders
South Korean footballers
Expatriate footballers in Brazil
South Korean expatriate footballers
Gyeongnam FC players
Incheon United FC players
Marília Atlético Clube players
Gwangju FC players
K League 1 players
K League 2 players
Sportspeople from Busan